GEDmatch is an online service to compare autosomal DNA data files from different testing companies. The website gained significant media coverage in April 2018 after it was used by law enforcement to identify a suspect in the Golden State Killer case in California. Other law-enforcement agencies started using GEDmatch for violent crimes, making it "the de facto DNA and genealogy database for all of law enforcement", according to The Atlantics Sarah Zhang.

In May 2019, GEDmatch then tightened its rules on privacy by requiring users to "opt in" to sharing their data with law enforcement. In December 2019, GEDmatch was acquired by Verogen, Inc., a sequencing company dedicated to forensic science. A new version of the existing site known as GEDmatch Pro, which went live in December 2020, focuses on solving crimes using the more than 1.2 million DNA profiles hosted on GEDMatch's platform.

History
GEDmatch was founded in 2010 by Curtis Rogers, a retired businessman, and John Olson, a transportation engineer, in Lake Worth, Florida, with its main purpose being to help "amateur and professional researchers and genealogists", including adoptees searching for birth parents.

GEDmatch users may upload their autosomal DNA test data from commercial DNA companies to identify potential relatives who had also uploaded their DNA data. Names of participants may be hidden by the use of aliases, but each account must have an email address attached to it. Users may share the ancestry of each DNA participant by uploading a GEDCOM file containing that person's ancestry, or by linking to the assigned DNA kit number from that person's profile at WikiTree, a free, shared global family tree. Tools available on the GEDmatch site include the ability to sort results by the closest matches to a user's autosomal DNA, determining whether one's matches also match to each other, using a genetic-distance calculator, estimating the number of generations to the most recent common ancestor, determining whether one's parents are related, and using various ethnicity calculators. These tools do not disclose raw genetic data to other users.

Tier 1 premium membership includes triangulation, matching segment search and a custom comparison system. By May 2018, the GEDmatch database had 929,000 genetic profiles, with 7,300 users who paid $10 a month for Tier 1 premium membership, which was used to pay for the $200,000/year server costs. In 2018, the website was still being run by Rogers and Olsen with five volunteers; it had no full-time staff. Rogers said in 2018 that the site had already helped 10,000 adoptees find their biological parents.

Access for law enforcement to the user data was given without informed consent; negative user reactions led to the implementation of an opt-in system for law-enforcement matching. For new uploads, "opt in" is the default selection actively recommended for users, and what is being opted into is not explicitly stated.

In September 2019, the U.S Department of Justice released interim guidelines governing when federal investigators or federally funded investigations could use genetic genealogy to track down suspects in serious crimes. This first-ever policy covering how these databases should be used in law-enforcement attempts to balance public safety and privacy concerns. The policy said that “forensic genetic genealogy” should generally be used only for violent crimes such as murder and rape, as well as to identify human remains. (The policy permitted broader use if the ancestry database's policy allowed such searches.) Investigators should first exhaust traditional crime-solving methods, including searching their own criminal DNA databases.

Under the new policy, investigators could not quietly upload a fake profile to a genealogy website, as some had done in hopes of finding a suspect's distant relatives, without first identifying themselves. And the site itself must have informed its users that law-enforcement agencies may search their data.

The policy also barred federal investigators from using a suspect's DNA profile to look for genes related to disease risks or psychological traits. Another provision attempted to limit situations in which federal investigators secretly take a DNA sample from a suspect's relative—from a discarded cup or tissue, for example—to help home in on a suspect. The policy said that the person must give their informed consent unless federal investigators have obtained a search warrant. These guidelines applied to federal investigators and federally funded investigations but did not apply to state or local law-enforcement agencies the vast majority of investigations.

In November 2019, a Florida judge approved a police request for a warrant to search the database of GEDmatch.

As of December 9, 2019, GEDmatch was acquired by Verogen, Inc., a sequencing company solely dedicated to forensic science. For the 1.2 million DNA profiles, a new version of the existing site will focus on solving crimes. How much GEDmatch continues to serve genetic genealogical research has been heavily discussed since then. BuzzFeed News reported that Verogen hopes to monetize the site by charging for access to the database and tools for DNA analysis. Founder Curtis Rogers, in a website statement, announced that "basic tools will remain free", he will remain involved in all aspects of the business, and Verogen will commit to the vision of a consumer genealogy site and take care of infrastructure and security/privacy. At the same time, Rogers claimed that "genealogy has made our communities safer by putting violent criminals behind bars".
As of September 2020, there were about 1.45 million users on the site, and by October, the site had led to an estimated 150 arrests in cold cases.

Usage by law enforcement
In December 2018, police forces in the United States said that, with the help of GEDmatch and genetic genealogy, they had been able to find suspects in a total of 28 cold cases of murder and rape that year. Also in December 2018, Family Tree DNA allowed law enforcement agencies, including the FBI, to upload DNA profiles from crime scenes to help solve cold crimes. As of that time, GEDmatch was not the only site that could be used by law enforcement officials to solve crimes using genetic genealogy.

White people are overrepresented on GEDmatch and are believed to be underrepresented in CODIS, the FBI's collection of DNA samples pulled from crime scenes, arrestees, and criminal suspects. Thus, GEDmatch may be especially effective in facilitating the arrests of white suspects who might otherwise have eluded law enforcement. On May 18, 2019, GEDmatch revised its privacy statement to users regarding the collection and use of genetic information, including the circumstances in which it may cooperate with law-enforcement use of its database. As of September 2020, GEDmatch has been credited for helping facilitate nearly 120 cold-case arrests and for helping in 11 "Jane and John Doe" identifications across the United States.

General cases solved or suspects identified using GEDmatch 

 California law enforcement investigating the Golden State Killer case uploaded the DNA profile of the suspected serial rapist/killer from an intact rape kit in Ventura County to GEDmatch. It identified 10 to 20 distant relatives of the Golden State Killer, and a team of five investigators working with genealogist Barbara Rae-Venter used those results to construct a large family tree, which led them to identify former police officer Joseph James DeAngelo as a suspect. Investigators acquired samples of his DNA from items he discarded outside his home, one of which definitively matched that of the killer. The process took about four months, from the time the first matches appeared on GEDmatch to the time when DeAngelo was arrested in April 2018.
 In September 2018, Roy Charles Waller was arrested as a suspect in a series of more than ten rapes between 1991 and 2006 in Northern California (the "Norcal Rapist"), after DNA evidence from crime scenes were matched on GEDmatch to a relative. Police then constructed a family tree and, using the known characteristics of the rapist, narrowed the suspects down to Waller. It took little more than a week to identify and arrest the suspect. He was charged with 40 counts of rape.
In May 2019, a grand jury in Orange County, North Carolina, indicted John Russell Whitt on first-degree murder charges related to the death of his son, Robert "Bobby" Adam Whitt. Bobby Whitt's skeleton was discovered under a billboard on Interstate 85-40 in September 1998; an autopsy showed that he had died by strangulation. Although the case remained open, and hundreds of investigators worked on it over the yearsincluding forensic artist Frank Benderthe remains were unidentified until Barbara Rae-Venter analyzed a DNA sample that suggested the boy had one white parent and one Asian parent. Using online genealogical services, she located a cousin in Hawai'i, who was able to provide the boy's name. The family had not reported him missing because they believed his mother, Myoung Hwa Cho, had taken him back to South Korea, where she was from. Further investigation revealed that Cho's body had been located in Spartanburg County, South Carolina, on May 13, 1998. She had been suffocated and had ligature marks around her wrists. John Whitt has confessed to both murders; he is currently serving a federal prison sentence at the Ashland FCI for armed robbery and will not be eligible for release on that charge until 2037.
In 2020, in Toronto, Canada, police used GEDmatch to identify the murderer of Christine Jessop.

Parabon Nanolabs 
In cooperation with American law enforcement organizations, Parabon NanoLabs started uploading DNA evidence from crime scenes to GEDmatch in an attempt to identify perpetrators. In November 2018, Parabon was reported to be working on 200 such cases. In May 2019, they said they were solving cold cases at the rate of about one per week.

DNA Doe Project 

Two genealogical researchers, Dr. Colleen M. Fitzpatrick and Margaret Press, started the DNA Doe Project in 2017 to identify unknown bodies using GEDmatch. They use volunteers to construct the sometimes very large family trees resulting from genetic data, in order to identify missing persons. Their successes include the following:
 Identification of the "Buckskin girl", a young woman found murdered beside a road in Miami County, Ohio, in 1981, as Marcia King. She was identified by autosomal DNA through GEDmatch and genetic genealogy in March 2018.
 They also investigated a man called Joseph Newton Chandler III, found to have stolen the identity of an eight-year-old in 1978 and committed suicide in 2002 in Eastlake, Ohio, obtained a sample of his DNA and uploaded it to GEDmatch. By the genetic results, researchers identified him as Robert Ivan Nichols. This finding was revealed in late June 2018.
 They helped identify "Sheep Flats Jane Doe", a homicide victim from July 1982, who was identified as 33-year-old Mary Silvani in the summer of 2018. She had been raped and murdered near Lake Tahoe, Nevada. Washoe County Sheriff's Office withheld her name until May 2019, when they had also confirmed the identity of her killer, James Richard Curry. He had died in jail in January 1983, after confessing to two other murders and being arrested in a third. He was also identified through genetic genealogy, with the aid of the DNA Doe Project and GEDmatch.
 In December 2018, they identified a man using the alias "Alfred Jake Fuller" when he was found dead in 2014 in a Kennebec County, Maine, hotel apartment. He had died of natural causes.
 In December 2018, they identified "Anaheim Jane Doe", who had been found murdered in 1987 in Anaheim, Orange County, California. The police announced the victim's identify as 20-year-old Tracey Coreen Hobson.
 In January 2019, they identified "Lavender Doe", a young woman whose burned body had been found near a road in Gregg County, Texas, in 2006. East Texas officials announced that she was 21-year-old Dana Lynn Dodd. Joseph Burnette had confessed to her murder in 2018 but had not known her identity.
 In February 2019, a man called "Rock County John Doe" was identified using GEDmatch. His body had been found in 1995 (it was estimated he had died in 1994) in Rock County, near Clinton, Wisconsin. The police medical examiner concluded that he had died from hypothermia.
 In March 2019, the DNA Doe Project identified "Butler County Jane Doe" as 61-year-old Darlene Wilson Norcross. Norcross' body had been found in a wooded area near West Chester, Ohio, on March 7, 2015. She had never been reported as missing, and the police were unable to determine her cause of death.
 In March 2019, the project identified "Annie Doe" as 16-year-old Annie Marie Lehman who was found on August 19, 1971, in Cave Junction, Oregon, near the border with California. Some debris was noted to partially conceal the remains. The project was through collaboration with NCMEC and NamUs.
 In June 2019, "Vicky" Doe (one of serial killer Shawn Grate's first victims), murdered between 2002 and 2006 was identified as 23-year-old Dana Nicole Lowrey.
 In July 2019, "Belle in the Well", the remains of a woman found strangled in a well in Chesapeake, Ohio, in 1981, was identified as Louise Virginia Peterson Flesher. Flesher was about 65 years old at the time of her murder and was born in West Virginia.

Florida Department of Law Enforcement’s Genetic Genealogy Program 
In 2018, the Florida Department of Law Enforcement set up a Genetic Genealogy Program to use GEDmatch to solve cold cases. They reported in 2019 that they had solved four cases.  By the end of 2020, the program had led to 10 arrests/identifications and closed several more cases.

Data policy
In April 2018, GEDmatch's privacy statement said that it "exists to provide DNA and genealogy tools for comparison and research purposes". The statement said that this, "by its very nature, requires the sharing of information. Because of that, users participating in this site should expect that their information will be shared with other users".

After the arrest of the suspect in the Golden State Killer Case, co-founder Curtis Rogers said he spent weeks trying to figure out the ethics of the situation and legal options to pursue. He concluded that they did not have the resources to require police to obtain court orders to use the website. Rogers said: "It has always been GEDmatch's policy to inform users that the database could be used for other uses, as set forth in the Site Policy", and that "While the database was created for genealogical research, it is important that GEDmatch participants understand the possible uses of their DNA, including identification of relatives that have committed crimes or were victims of crimes." In late May 2018, GEDmatch updated its policy to say law enforcement could use the database to identify perpetrators of a "violent crime", meaning "homicide or sexual assault", or to identify the remains of a deceased individual. The number of people uploading their DNA increased from 1,500 per day to 5,000 per day after the DeAngelo case went public.  By November 2018, there were 1.2 million GEDmatch website users.

In May 2019, GEDmatch was used to help with the arrest of a teenager who was charged with violent assault. This was the first and so far the last time GEDmatch had been used by Law Enforcement (and Parabon) for a case that did not involve homicide, rape, or kidnapping.

Civil libertarians have said the use of websites such as GEDmatch by law enforcement raises legal and privacy concerns. Professor Rori Rohlfs at San Francisco State University noted that, whereas California police had to get a judge's permission to search the CODIS police criminal database for a murder suspect's brother, they had no limitations when uploading a murder suspect's autosomal DNA to GEDmatch to identify relatives. In 2019, Charles E. Sydnor III, a Maryland delegate, sought a bill to prohibit law enforcement from using DNA databases for crime solving, but the bill was not passed. A state representative in Utah introduced a similar bill that would ban genetic genealogy searches by police.

Opt-in policy 

In May 2019, GEDmatch began requiring people who had uploaded their DNA to its site to opt in to allow law-enforcement agencies to access their information. This change in privacy policy was expected to limit law enforcement agencies' abilities to identify suspects using genetic genealogy. By May 2020, about 260,000 GEDmatch users had opted in.

Despite GEDmatch's opt-in policy, in fall 2019, it was served with a warrant by law enforcement in Florida, demanding access to all of its DNA profiles, including those of the vast majority of users who had not opted in to allow law-enforcement access (at that time, approximately 185,000 of 1.3 million users had opted in). GEDmatch complied with this warrant.

See also
Combined DNA Index System
Family Tree DNA
GEDCOM
Investigative genetic genealogy

References

Further reading

External links
 GEDmatch 

2010 establishments in Florida
Companies based in Palm Beach County, Florida
Internet properties established in 2010
American genealogy websites
Genetic genealogy companies
Lake Worth Beach, Florida
Biometric databases
American companies established in 2010